Madhvacharya (1986) is a Kannada language film directed by G. V. Iyer. The film is based on the life and teachings of the founder of the Tattvavada philosophy, Madhvacharya. Ananthalakshmi Films produced this film and Theatrical Distributor was the distributor of the film. This film screened at 11th IFFI panorama. It won the National Award for Dr.M. Balamuralikrishna as the Best Music Director.

Synopsis
The film is based on life of Madhavacharya, A Vaishnavite Scholar.

Cast and crew

Cast
Purna Prasad as adult Madhvacharya
Avinash as teen Madhvacharya
Shrivathsa as Vasudeva/Bala Madhva
Vijaya Shri as Baby Vasudeva
G. M. Krishnamurthy as Achyuta Prajna
Hayagrivachar as Pandit Trivikrama
G. V. Shivanand as Vedavyasa
Aanda Teertha as Ravindra

Crew
Director : G. V. Iyer
Screenplay : G. V. Iyer, Sri Bannanje Govindacharya
Cinematographer : Madhu Ambat
Editing : V. R. K. Prasad
Music direction : M. Balamuralikrishna
Art Direction : P. Krishnamurthy
Sound : Kitty Govindaswamy

Soundtrack

References

1986 films
1980s Kannada-language films
Films scored by M. Balamuralikrishna
Indian biographical films
Madhvacharya
Biographical films about religious leaders
Films whose production designer won the Best Production Design National Film Award
1980s biographical films